Smarr is an unincorporated community and census-designated place (CDP) in Monroe County, in the U.S. state of Georgia. It was first listed as a CDP in the 2020 census with a population of 218.

History
Smarr was established in 1838 when the railroad was extended to that point, and named for the founder.

Variant names were "Smarrs" and "Smarrs Station". A post office called Smarr's Station was established in 1872, and the name was shortened to Smarrs in 1895.

Geography
Smarr is in central Monroe County on U.S. Route 41, which leads northwest  to Forsyth, the county seat, and southeast  to Macon.

Demographics

2020 census

Note: the US Census treats Hispanic/Latino as an ethnic category. This table excludes Latinos from the racial categories and assigns them to a separate category. Hispanics/Latinos can be of any race.

References

Census-designated places in Monroe County, Georgia
Macon metropolitan area, Georgia